"Manhattan-Kaboul" is a French song written by Renaud and composed by Jean-Pierre Bucolo, sung by Renaud in duo with Axelle Red, from the album Boucan d'enfer (2002). It was written in the aftermath of the incidents of September 11, 2001 and the War in Afghanistan. The song was very successful in France and Belgium, becoming a top five hit in these countries. As of August 2014, it is the 67th best-selling single of the 21st century in France, with 355,000 units sold.

Synopsis
In the song, two victims of the events of 2001 sing about their situations and the causes of their death. Renaud sings as a young Puerto-Rican who works in the World Trade Center in New York City, destroyed on September 11. Axelle Red sings as a young Afghan girl killed during the attack by the coalition forces during the autumn of 2001.

The song utilizes symbolism and imagery, with a subtle religious undertone throughout. Though the song is about terrorism and its repercussions, it does not directly mention terrorism nor deal explicitly with political issues, focusing instead on civilian suffering caused by the events.

There are many religious images used throughout the song, such as "l'autel" (the altar), "les dieux" (the gods) and "les religions." The song concludes that religions, wars, and countries victimize ordinary people for their own purposes.

Awards
The song was elected the "Original Song of the Year" at the Victoires de la Musique 2003 and the "French song of the Year" at NRJ Music Awards 2003.

Cover versions and television performances
 Patrick Coutin, who had composed the famous hit "J'aime regarder les filles" in 1981, has covered the song in 2003 for the French programme Retour gagnant : a CD containing all the songs from the show has been released by Universal Music.
 Renaud performed "Manhattan-Kaboul" on October 30, 2004, with 500 singers from the choir "Les Fous chantants" of Alès on the show 500 Choristes ensemble on TF1.
 The song has been covered by Joan Baez.
 Philippe Berizzi has translated the song in Esperanto (he has received a permission for the translation).
 Laurent Gerra has parodied the song, under the title "Washington-Bagdad".

Track listings
 CD single
 "Manhattan-Kaboul" — 3:52
 "Tout Arrêter..." — 3:21

Charts and sales

Peak positions

Year-end charts

Certifications

See also
 List of anti-war songs

References

Songs about New York City
Songs about Afghanistan
2002 singles
Axelle Red songs
Renaud songs
Music about the September 11 attacks
Male–female vocal duets